Geraldine Lee Wei Ling (born 19 June 1987) is a Singaporean kayaker. During the 2012 Summer Olympics, she represented Singapore in the Women's Kayak Single (K1) 200m and Women's Kayak Single (K1) 500m.

References

External links
 

1987 births
Singaporean female canoeists
Olympic canoeists of Singapore
Living people
Singaporean sportspeople of Chinese descent
Canoeists at the 2012 Summer Olympics
Canoeists at the 2010 Asian Games
Canoeists at the 2014 Asian Games
Canoeists at the 2018 Asian Games
Asian Games competitors for Singapore